BC-1, BC.1, BC1, BC 1 or variant may refer to:

 North American T-6 Texan, an aircraft, first model supplied to the USAAC
 North American BC-1A, an aircraft
 Backcrossing, in genetics
 BC1, Paralympic boccia classification
 Battlefield: Bad Company 1, a video game
 British Columbia Highway 1, a freeway
 Global News: BC 1, a TV station

See also
 1 BC
 BCA (disambiguation)
 BCI (disambiguation)
 BC (disambiguation)
 BC2 (disambiguation)